This Is Going to Hurt is a British medical comedy-drama television miniseries, created by Adam Kay and based on his memoir of the same name. The show was co-produced by the BBC and AMC. It focuses on the lives of a group of junior doctors working on an obstetrics and gynaecology ward in a National Health Service hospital. It profiles their professional and personal lives and explores the emotional effects of working in a stressful work environment. The series closely follows the stories of Adam Kay (Ben Whishaw) and Shruti Acharya (Ambika Mod) as they work through the ranks of hospital hierarchy. These characters both break the fourth wall and directly address viewers with dialogue. This Is Going to Hurt presents its stories with comedic and dramatic tones. The seven-part series premiered on BBC One and BBC iPlayer on 8 February 2022. It began airing on AMC+ in the United States on 2 June 2022.

Premise
The series is a fictional adaptation of Adam Kay's book This Is Going To Hurt. Set in London during 2006, it focuses on a group of junior doctors working on a busy obstetrics and gynaecology ward located in an NHS hospital. It has frank honesty in the depiction of working in obstetrics and gynaecology. It fully explores the emotional effects working in a hospital environment has on its staff. It explores the lack of support for junior doctors and how their achievements are unsung. The personal lives of the junior doctors are also explored throughout the episodes.

Cast and characters
 Ben Whishaw as Adam Kay
 Ambika Mod as Shruti Acharya
 Alex Jennings as Nigel Lockhart
 Michele Austin as Tracy
 Rory Fleck Byrne as Harry Muir
 Ashley McGuire as Vicky Houghton
 Kadiff Kirwan as Julian
 Harriet Walter as Veronique
 Josie Walker as Non-reassuring Trace
 Philippa Dunne as Ria
 Michael Workeye as Ben
 Tom Durant-Pritchard as Greg
 Alice Orr-Ewing as Emma
 Hannah Onslow as Erika Van Hegen
 Rosie Akerman as Paula Van Hegen
 George Somner as Al
 Agata Jarosz as Agnieska
 Yasmin Wilde as Benilda
 James Corrigan as Welly
 Sophie Winkleman as Kathleen Mullender
 The Vivienne as The Drag Queen

Episodes

Production

Development
In September 2017, it was announced that Sister Pictures had acquired television rights to This Is Going to Hurt by Adam Kay, with Kay serving as writer and executive producer. They acquired the rights following a twelve-way auction. Alongside Kay, Naomi de Pear and Katie Carpenter were appointed developers and executive producers of the series. At the time, Pear expressed her desire to create the series because "the NHS is a magnificent beast and it’s imperative that this story be told now." In June 2018, it was announced that BBC controller of drama Piers Wenger commissioned the series for an eight-episode order for the BBC Two channel, with AMC co-producing the series. The final episode count produced is seven episodes. Production companies involved in the series include Sister Pictures, Terrible Productions, BBC Studios and AMC Studios, with BBC Studios handling international distribution. Lucy Forbes serves as the director for episodes 1 to 4 and Tom Kingsley directed episodes 5 to 7. Mona Qureshi was appointed as an executive producer from the BBC. Other executive producers included Jane Featherstone, James Farrell, Kristin Jones and AMC Studio's co-president Dan McDermott. In December 2021, it was announced that the BBC had decided to broadcast the series on BBC One instead of BBC Two. The show premiered on BBC One in the UK on 8 February 2022. Each episode has a forty-five minute running time.

Soundtrack

The show's soundtrack was composed by Jarvis Cocker led band Jarv Is, who described it as "our love song to the NHS". Each episode of the show features at least one song with lyrics by Cocker. A full soundtrack album was released digitally in March 2022 by the band Jarv Is under the Rough Trade Records label. The vinyl edition of the album was released in October 2022.

Casting
In June 2020, Ben Whishaw joined the cast in the lead role of Adam Kay. Whishaw's casting was met with unanimous approval from the networks involved in the project. Controller of BBC Drama, Wenger said it was "a testament to the quality" of scripts that Whishaw had signed up. McDermott, co-president of AMC Studios was "thrilled" to secure an "established talent". Early on, Ambika Mod had signed up to play Shruti Acharya, a junior doctor (SHO) in obstetrics and gynaecology. Mod received the first scripts for the role in mid-2020. She recalled that upon reading through the first episode, Mod felt as though the role was "meant" for her. In June 2021, the casting details of the remainder of main roles in the series were announced. These castings consisted of hospital staff and Adam's personal relations. Michele Austin was cast as a sharp-witted midwife called Tracy, Kadiff Kirwan plays Julian who is Adam's rival work colleague, Ashley McGuire appears as consultant Vicky Houghton and Alex Jennings as consultant Nigel Lockhart who is Adam's boss. The casting of Adam's relatives included his boyfriend Harry Muir played by Rory Fleck Byrne, Harriet Walter as Adam's mother Veronique and Tom Durant-Pritchard as his best friend Greg.

In September 2021, Michael Workeye revealed he had filmed a role in the series. He stated that working with Whishaw and Kay was a "dream". In November 2021, Josie Walker publicly revealed her involvement in the series, playing Non-Reassuring Trace. Other castings included James Corrigan as Welly and Alice Orr-Ewing as Emma. In one episode, British drag queen The Vivienne makes a cameo appearance working as a nightclub bouncer.

Filming
Principal photography began by February 2021 and wrapped in June. In various scenes, the characters Adam and Shruti both break the fourth wall and directly address viewers with dialogue. Scenes of the exterior of the hospital were filmed at Ealing Hospital.

Reception

Critical response
The series was positively received by critics, with review aggregator Rotten Tomatoes reporting 94% approval over 36 reviews with an average rating of 8.9. The website's critics consensus reads, "Ben Whishaw's live-wire performance of an exhausted doctor powers This is Going to Hurt, a smart drama full of humor and pain." Metacritic, which uses a weighted average, assigned a score of 91 out of 100 based on 20 critics, indicating "universal acclaim".

The Radio Times rated the opening episode 5/5 stars, with Lauren Morris writing "the comedy drama impresses with its strong cast, bolstered by the show's soundtrack of mid-noughties earworms", while Lucy Mangan for The Guardian, rating the first episode 4/5 stars, wrote that it "pulls no punches in portraying the difficulties of life as a junior medic". However, Rachel Cooke of the New Statesman found "unlikability" of the characters to be a "problem".

Ed Cumming for The Independent praised the "good sense" casting of Whishaw in the main role. Cumming thought it was unlike other medical dramas, such as Holby City. He believed they shared the same principles, being that "in TV and in life: the stakes are always high in a hospital". Katie Rosseinsky writing for the Evening Standard liked the "nostalgia in the show’s mid-Noughties backdrop". She also praised Whishaw; noting that the rate of drama is chaotic but Whishaw is "such an engaging performer that the whole thing feels effortlessly authentic". She added that while Whishaw is "the anchor in the whirlwind of the ward" the show has a "similarly impressive" ensemble cast. Rosseinsky praised Mod for her "standout in her first major TV role" and added that Kadiff Kirwan "is enjoyably superior as Adam’s peer Julian". The critic concluded that the show is "a deeply nuanced tribute that’s by turns horribly funny, heartbreakingly sad and righteously angry". Jack King from GQ branded Shruti's story as the show's "most compelling, heart-wrenching subplots". He praised Mod's performance and called her "2022's first bona fide breakout".

Juliet Pearce, director of nursing midwifery at the Isle of Wight NHS Trust, praised the show. She described it as "hilarious and heart-breaking" and a "reminder of the human emotions behind every tired, scared and fallible healthcare professional". Jess Phillips, Labour MP for Birmingham Yardley, praised the series for highlighting the pressures of working in the NHS.

Some viewers considered the series to be an accurate depiction of life on a maternity ward, but others saw it as misogynistic. Harriet Sherwood for The Guardian reported that some viewers accused the series of depicting birth as traumatic, and women as disempowered, dysfunctional and reduced to "slabs of meat". Milli Hill, author of The Positive Birth Book, and proponent of “alternate” birthing methods, accused Adam Kay and the creators of the show of sexism. Hill criticised the show for misogyny. Some pregnant women reported on social media that they had been advised to avoid watching the show by their midwives.

Viewing figures

The first episode was watched 4,753,000 times on iPlayer alone during 2022, making it the 10th most viewed individual programme on the platform that year.

Awards and nominations

References

External links
 
 

2020s British drama television series
2020s British LGBT-related drama television series
2020s British medical television series
2020s British television miniseries
2022 British television series debuts
2022 British television series endings
AMC (TV channel) original programming
BBC medical television shows
BBC television dramas
English-language television shows
Gay-related television shows
Television shows based on books
Television series by BBC Studios
Television series set in 2006
Works about midwifery